The black-eyed pea or black-eyed bean is a legume grown around the world for its medium-sized, edible bean. It is a subspecies of the cowpea, an Old World plant domesticated in Africa, and is sometimes simply called a cowpea.

The common commercial variety is called the California Blackeye; it is pale-colored with a prominent black spot. The American South has countless varieties, many of them heirloom, that vary in size from the small lady peas to very large ones. The color of the eye may be black, brown, red, pink, or green. All the peas are green when freshly shelled and brown or buff when dried. A popular variation of the black-eyed pea is the purple hull pea or mud-in-your-eye pea; it is usually green with a prominent purple or pink spot. The currently accepted botanical name for the black-eyed pea is Vigna unguiculata subsp. unguiculata, although previously it was classified in the genus Phaseolus.  Vigna unguiculata subsp. dekindtiana is the wild relative and Vigna unguiculata subsp. sesquipedalis is the related asparagus bean. Other beans of somewhat similar appearance, such as the frijol ojo de cabra (goat's-eye bean) of northern Mexico, are sometimes incorrectly called black-eyed peas, and vice versa.

History
The Black eyed pea originates from West Africa and has been cultivated in China and India since prehistoric times. It was grown in Virginia since the 17th century by African slaves who were brought to America along with the indigenous plants from their homelands. The crop would also eventually  prove popular in Texas. The planting of crops of black-eyed peas was promoted by George Washington Carver because, as a legume, it adds nitrogen to the soil and has high nutritional value. Throughout the South, the black-eyed pea is still a widely used ingredient today in soul food and cuisines of the Southern United States. The black eye pea is cultivated throughout the world.

Cultivation

This heat-loving crop should be sown after all danger of frost has passed and the soil is warm. Seeds sown too early will rot before germination.  Black-eyed peas are extremely drought tolerant, so excessive watering should be avoided.

The crop is relatively free of pests and disease. Root-knot nematodes can be a problem, especially if crops are not rotated. As a nitrogen-fixing legume, fertilization can exclude nitrogen three weeks after germination.

The blossom produces nectar plentifully, and large areas can be a source of honey. Because the bloom attracts a variety of pollinators, care must be taken in the application of insecticides to avoid label violations.

After planting the pea, it should start to grow after 2–5 days.

Lucky New Year food

Southern United States
In the Southern United States, eating black-eyed peas or Hoppin' John (a traditional soul food) on New Year's Day is thought to bring prosperity in the new year. The peas are typically cooked with a pork product for flavoring (such as bacon, fatback, ham bones, or hog jowls) and diced onion, and served with a hot chili sauce or a pepper-flavored vinegar. The traditional meal also includes cabbage, collard, turnip, or mustard greens, and ham. The peas, since they swell when cooked, symbolize prosperity; the greens symbolize money; the pork, because pigs root forward when foraging, represents positive motion. Cornbread, which represents gold, also often accompanies this meal.

Several legends exist as to the origin of this custom. Two popular explanations for the South's association with peas and good luck date back to the American Civil War. The first is associated with General William T. Sherman's march of the Union Army to the sea, during which they pillaged the Confederates' food supplies. Stories say peas and salted pork were said to have been left untouched, because of the belief that they were animal food unfit for human consumption. Southerners considered themselves lucky to be left with some supplies to help them survive the winter, and black-eyed peas evolved into a representation of good luck. One challenge to this legend is that General Sherman brought backup supplies with him including three days of animal feed and would have been unlikely to have left even animal feed untouched.  In addition, the dates of the first average frost for Atlanta and Savannah, respectively, are November 13 and November 28.  As Sherman's march was from November 15 to December 21, 1864, it is improbable, although possible, that the Union Army would have come across standing fields of black-eyed peas as relayed in most versions of the legend.  In another Southern tradition, black-eyed peas were a symbol of emancipation for African-Americans who had previously been enslaved, and who after the Civil War were officially freed on New Years Day.

Other Southern American traditions point to Jews of Ashkenazi and Sephardic ancestry in Southern cities and plantations eating the peas.

Culinary uses worldwide

Africa and Middle East
In Egypt, black-eyed peas called lobia, when cooked with onions, garlic, meat, and tomato juice and served with Egyptian rice with some pastina called shaerya mixed in, make the most famous rice dish in Egypt.

In Jordan, Lebanon, and Syria, lobya or green black-eyed-beans are cooked with onion, garlic, tomatoes, peeled and chopped, olive oil, salt and black pepper.

In Nigeria and Ghana within West Africa and the Caribbean, a traditional dish called akara or koose comprises mashed black-eyed peas with added salt, onions and/or peppers. The mixture is then fried. In Nigeria a pudding called 'moin-moin' is made from ground and mixed peas with seasoning as well as some plant proteins before it is steamed. This is served with various carbohydrate-rich foods such as pap, rice or garri.

Asia and the Pacific
In Indonesia, black-eyed peas are called kacang tunggak or kacang tolo in the local language. They are commonly used in curry dishes such as sambal goreng, a hot and spicy red curry dish, sayur brongkos, or sayur lodeh.

The bean is commonly used across India. In North India, black-eyed peas are called lobia or rongi and cooked like daal, served with boiled rice. In Maharashtra, they are called chawli  and made into a curry called chawli amti or chawli usal. In Karnataka they are called alsande kalu and used in the preparation of huli, a popular type of curry. In South Kanara district they are called as lathanay dha beeja and are cooked in spiced coconut paste to make a saucy curry or a dry coconut curry.  In Tamil Nadu, they are called karamani or thattapayaru and used in various recipes, including being boiled and made into a salad-like sundal (often during the Ganesh Chaturthi and Navratri festivals). In Andhra Pradesh they are known by the name alasandalu and are used for variety of recipes, most popularly for Vada. In Kerala, they are a part of the Sadhya dish, Olan.

In Vietnam, black-eyed peas are used in a sweet dessert called chè đậu trắng (black-eyed peas and sticky rice with coconut milk).

Europe
In Cyprus (φρέσκο λουβί (fresko luvi)), Greece (μαυρομάτικα) and Turkey (börülce salatası), blanched black-eyed peas are eaten as salad with a dressing of olive oil, salt, lemon juice, onions and garlic.

In Portugal, black-eyed peas are served with boiled cod and potatoes, with tuna, and in salads.

The Americas
North America
"Hoppin' John", made of black-eyed peas or field peas, rice, and pork, is a traditional dish of parts of the Southern United States.

Texas caviar, another traditional dish in the American South, is made from black-eyed peas marinated in vinaigrette-style dressing and chopped garlic.

South America
In Brazil's northeastern state of Bahia, especially in the city of Salvador, black-eyed peas (named "feijão fradinho" there) are used in a traditional street food of West African cuisine origin called acarajé. The beans are peeled and mashed, and the resulting paste is made into balls and deep fried in dendê. Acarajé is typically served split in half and stuffed with vatapá, caruru, diced green and red tomatoes, fried sun-dried shrimp and homemade hot sauce.

In the northern part of Colombia, they are used to prepare a fritter called buñuelo. The beans are immersed in water for a few hours to loosen their skins and soften them. The skins are then removed either by hand or with the help of a manual grinder. Once the skins are removed, the bean is ground or blended, and eggs are added, which produces a soft mix. The mix is fried in hot oil. It makes a nutritious breakfast meal.

In Guyana, South America, and Trinidad and Tobago, it is one of the most popular type of beans cooked with rice, the main one being red kidney beans, also referred to as red beans. It is also cooked as a snack or appetizer on its own. On New Year's Eve (referred to as Old Year's Night in Guyana and Suriname), families cook a traditional dish called cook-up rice. The dish comprises rice, black-eyed peas, and other peas and a variety of meats cooked in coconut milk and seasonings. According to tradition, cook-up rice should be the first thing consumed in the New Year for good luck. Cook-up rice is also made as an everyday dish.

Nutritional benefits 
This vegetable is a decent source of complex starches, fiber, and numerous fundamental nutrients and minerals. One cup or 165 grams (g) of cooked black-eyed peas contains:

 160 calories
 0.6 g fat
 33.5 g carbs
 5.2 g protein
 8.3 g fiber
 5.3 g of sugar
 10% of the daily value (DV) for iron
 16% of the DV for calcium
 15% of the DV for potassium
 20% of the DV for magnesium
 24% of the DV for copper
 15% of the DV for zinc
 52% of the DV for folate
 44% of the DV for vitamin A
 37% of the DV for vitamin K
 41% of the DV for manganese
Black-eyed pea contains some important source of nutritional benefits and also have the following health benefits listed below:

Supporting Digestion 
Black-eyed peas can assist with further developing absorption for certain individuals because of their fiber content, which can assist with advancing customary solid discharges.
They also contain prebiotic fiber, which takes care of the useful microscopic organisms in the intestinal system.

It may help maintain a healthy weight 
They are a rich source of complex carbohydrates, which require more effort to process than basic carbohydrates. Therefore, individuals who eat them may feel more full, which can help maintain a healthy weight.

Lower cholesterol 
There is evidence that consistently eating vegetables can assist with bringing down LDL cholesterol. Bringing down elevated cholesterol can diminish the danger of coronary artery disease.

Support eye and Skin Health 
Black-eyed peas contain a large measure of beta carotene, which the body converts to Vitamin A. In a single serving, it meets a fourth of a typical adults daily Vitamin A requirement. Vitamin A is important for healthy eyes and skin.

See also

 Sea Island red pea
 Dixie Lee pea
 Adzuki bean
 Broad bean
 Chickpea
 Green bean
 Lentil
 List of diseases of the common bean
 Mung bean
 Organic beans
 Pulse (legume)

References

External links
 
 
 Plantnames.unimelb.edu.au Porcher Michel H. et al. 1995–2020, Sorting Vigna Names. Multilingual Multiscript Plant Name Database (M.M.P.N.D) – A Work in Progress. School of Agriculture and Food Systems. Faculty of Land & Food Resources.  The University of Melbourne. Australia.   (2005).
 Alternative Field Crops Manual: Cowpea

Crops originating from Asia
Cuisine of the Southern United States
Holiday foods
Edible legumes
Soul food
Vigna
Crops originating from Africa
Plant subspecies
African cuisine